The Party may refer to:

Arts and entertainment
The Party (Nineteen Eighty-Four) or Ingsoc, a fictional political entity in Orwell's Nineteen Eighty-Four

Film 
The Party (1968 film), an American comedy film 
The Party (1990 film), a Canadian drama film 
Party (1996 film), a Portuguese-French comedy-drama film
The Party (2017 film), a British comedy film

Television
"The Party" (Brooklyn Nine-Nine), an episode of the TV sitcom
"The Party", the pilot episode of As Told by Ginger
"The Party", an episode of Combat! (1963 TV series)
"The Party", an episode of Dynasty (1981 TV series)
"The Party", an episode of Life with Derek
"The Party", an episode of Animaniacs
"The Party", an episode of M*A*S*H (season 7)
"The Party", an episode of Modern Family (season 7)
"The Party", an episode of The Proud Family
"The Party", an episode of The Ropers
"The Party", an episode of The Amazing World Of Gumball
"The Party", an episode of The Office (British TV series)

Theatre
The Party (play), a 1958 play by Jane Arden
The Party, a play by Trevor Griffiths

Music  
The Party (band), an American pop band
The Party (The Party album), 1990
The Party (Alexia album), 1998
The Party (Andy Shauf album), 2016
The Party (Casiopea album), 1990
The Party (Houston Person album), 1991 
"The Party", a song by Phil Ochs on his 1967 album Pleasures of the Harbor
"The Party" (Uncanny X-Men song), 1985
"The Party" (Hightower song), 2017

Organisations and events
The Party (politics), in a one-party state (including a list of such parties)
The Party (demoparty), an annual demoscene event in Denmark 1991–2002
Triumph Heritage Empowerment Party (T.H.E. Party), a political party in Papua New Guinea
Die PARTEI (German, 'The PARTY'), a political party in Germany

See also

Party (disambiguation)
The Party Album (disambiguation)